WAIW is a Contemporary Worship formatted broadcast radio station licensed to Winchester, Virginia. WAIW is owned and operated by Educational Media Foundation.

Coverage area
With the station's transmitter located atop a mountain, WAIW's signal can be heard throughout the Shenandoah Valley, Central and Northern Virginia, the Eastern Panhandle and Potomac Highlands of West Virginia, parts of Central and Western Maryland and Metro Washington, D.C.

History
Former owner Centennial Broadcasting filed an agreement with the Federal Communications Commission (FCC) on October 6, 2020, to sell the former WINC-FM to Educational Media Foundation (EMF) for $1.75 million. WINC-FM's existing music programming moved to the co-owned WXBN (105.5 FM) and WZFC (104.9 FM) ahead of the sale; Centennial also retained the rights to the WINC callsign and branding. On November 18, 2020, EMF filed to operate WINC-FM as a non-commercial station upon closing.

The sale closed on December 29, 2020. At 2:37 p.m. that same day, WINC-FM abruptly signed off and around an hour later, at 3:29 p.m., the station signed back on IDing with the callsign WLWX and airing EMF's Air1 network. Sister station WAIW in Wheaton, Illinois and WLWX "traded" callsigns on January 11, 2021. The application to operate the station as non-commercial was approved one day later.

References

External links
Air1 Online
FCC History Cards for WAIW

1946 establishments in Virginia
Air1 radio stations
Radio stations established in 1946
AIW
Winchester, Virginia